Tobias Damm (born 30 October 1983) is a German football manager and a former player who is the manager of KSV Hessen Kassel. He spent two seasons in the Bundesliga with 1. FSV Mainz 05.

Coaching career
On 9 October 2019, Damm was appointed manager of KSV Hessen Kassel, where he spent many years as a player. On 19 December 2019, he extended his contract until 30 June 2021.

References

External links
 

1983 births
Living people
People from Homberg (Efze)
Sportspeople from Kassel (region)
German footballers
Bundesliga players
3. Liga players
Regionalliga players
1. FSV Mainz 05 players
Wuppertaler SV players
KSV Hessen Kassel players
Association football forwards
Footballers from Hesse
German football managers
KSV Hessen Kassel managers